In the ancient religion and mythology of Peru, Ecuador, and Bolivia, an  is the term used to describe the spirits of mountains and sometimes solitary rocks, typically displaying anthropomorphic features, that protect the local people. The term dates back to the Inca Empire.

Meanings
The word  has several possible meanings, depending on context.

 means "Lord" in Quechua. The Inca religion uses the term  to refer to a mountain with a living spirit; the body and energy of the mountain together form the spirit's  ("home" or "temple"). A number of different terms are used for different types of :

  – protector of a village (such as  Manuel Pinta)
  – protector of a region ( Mama Simona)
  – protector of a country (such as  Salkantay or  Ausangate)

Besides mountains there are other living beings that are considered  – the so-called .

The twelve sacred  of Cusco are: Ausangate, Salkantay, Mama Simona, Pillku Urqu, Manuel Pinta, Wanakawri, Pachatusan, Pikchu, Saksaywaman, Viraqochan, Pukin, and Sinqa.

Other  in Bolivia and Peru are: Akamari, Antikuna, Chachani, Kimsa Chata, Illampu, Lady of Illimani, Machu Picchu, Pitusiray, Putucusi, Qullqipunku, Sinaqara, Tunupa, Willka Wiqi (Wakay Willka), Wamanrasu, Wayna Picchu and Yanantin.

References

External links
Sacred Mountain Expedition: April 2007
Glossary of Terminology of the Shamanic & Ceremonial Traditions of the Inca Medicine Lineage as Practiced in the United States, A

Inca gods
South American deities
Mountain gods
Tutelary deities